Huntingdon station may refer to:

 Huntingdon railway station, a train station in Huntingdon, Cambridgeshire, England
 Huntingdon station (Amtrak), an Amtrak station in Huntingdon, Pennsylvania, USA
 Huntingdon station (SEPTA), a SEPTA rapid transit station in Philadelphia, Pennsylvania, USA

See also
Huntingdon (disambiguation)
Huntington Station (disambiguation)